The Skyrider Stingray is a German ultralight trike, designed and produced by Skyrider Flugschule. The aircraft is supplied as a complete ready-to-fly-aircraft.

Design and development
The Stingray was intended as a budget aircraft model and was introduced in 2007. It features a strut-braced hang glider-style high-wing, weight-shift controls, a two-seats-in-tandem open cockpit, tricycle landing gear and a single engine in pusher configuration. A fibreglass cockpit fairing and wheel pants are optional.

The aircraft is made from square welded stainless steel tubing, with its double surface wing covered in Dacron sailcloth. Its  span Bautek Pico wing is supported by struts and uses an "A" frame weight-shift control bar. The powerplant is a four stroke air and liquid-cooled, dual-ignition,  Rotax 912UL aircraft engine or optionally a twin cylinder, liquid-cooled, two-stroke, dual-ignition  Rotax 582 powerplant.

Specifications (Stingray)

References

External links

Photo of the Skyrider Stingray

2000s German sport aircraft
2000s German ultralight aircraft
Single-engined pusher aircraft
Ultralight trikes